Crystal Illusions is the fifth album by Sérgio Mendes and Brasil '66.

Track listing

Personnel
Sérgio Mendes – keyboards, vocals, arranger, producer
Lani Hall, Karen Philipp – vocals
Oscar Castro-Neves – guitar
Sebastião Neto – bass
Rubens Bassini – percussion
Dom Um Romão – drums
Herb Alpert – producer
Dave Grusin – orchestra arranger, conductor

References

1969 albums
Sérgio Mendes albums
Spanish-language albums
Albums conducted by Dave Grusin
Albums arranged by Dave Grusin
Albums produced by Sérgio Mendes
Albums produced by Herb Alpert
A&M Records albums